Nicolay Solberg (born 9 July 1991) is a Norwegian footballer, who plays for Fredrikstad.

Career
Solber made his debut for Lillestrøm on 20 March 2011 against Stabæk, a game they won 7–0. In 2012, he was loaned out to Sarpsborg 08 where he scored 14 goals.

Before the 2013 season he signed a contract with Fredrikstad.

After a lengthy battle with injuries, he signed for amateur team Sandefjord 2 in the summer of 2015, only to rapidly move on to third-tier club Ullern IF. In 2016, he went up another notch, to second-tier club Ullensaker/Kisa. He left the club at the end of 2018.

On 14 January 2019, Solberg signed with Norwegian 2. divisjon club Fredrikstad FK.

Career statistics

References

External links

1991 births
Living people
People from Horten
Sportspeople from Tønsberg
Norwegian footballers
Lillestrøm SK players
Sarpsborg 08 FF players
Ullern IF players
Fredrikstad FK players
Ullensaker/Kisa IL players
Norwegian First Division players
Norwegian Second Division players
Eliteserien players
Norwegian expatriate sportspeople in the United Arab Emirates
Association football midfielders
Sportspeople from Vestfold og Telemark